William Duer may refer to:
William Duer (Continental congressman) (1743–1799), New York speculator, Continental congressman and Assistant Secretary of the Treasury
William Alexander Duer (1780–1858), U.S. jurist, president of Columbia University, son of the Continental congressman
William Duer (U.S. Congressman) (1805–1879), U.S. lawyer and congressman from New York City; grandson of the Continental congressman